Carl Capria (born June 8, 1952) is a former American football defensive back. He played for the Detroit Lions in 1974 and for the New York Jets in 1975.

References

1952 births
Living people
American football defensive backs
Purdue Boilermakers football players
Detroit Lions players
New York Jets players